Rakesh Sharma (born 24 January 1972 in Moradabad) is an Indian-born cricketer who played for the Oman national cricket team. He is a right-handed batsman and a right-arm medium-fast bowler. He has made several appearances as a batsman in the 2005 ICC Trophy.

References

1982 births
Living people
Omani cricketers
People from Moradabad
Cricketers from Uttar Pradesh
Indian emigrants to Oman
Indian expatriates in Oman